Athletic Federation of Lithuania is the national sporting organisation recognised by the Lithuanian sports commission for athletics activity in Lithuania. Founded at 1921. Federation president is former 100 m and 200 m national champion Eimantas Skrabulis. Federation organizing Lithuanian Athletics Championships and  approving national records.

References

External links 
 Official website

Lithuania
Athletics in Lithuania
Sports governing bodies in Lithuania
1921 establishments in Lithuania
Sports organizations established in 1921
National governing bodies for athletics